(おんなけいず ゆしまのしらうめ), aka The White Plum of Yushima, is a 1955 black-and-white Japanese film directed by Teinosuke Kinugasa.

Plot
A highly esteemed student falls for Otsuta, a geisha.

Remake
A TV remake of the film was broadcast, by Fuji TV as part of Shionogi's sponsored TV theater program, between Thursday 9 June and Thursday 16 June in 1966, starring Fujiko Yamamoto who revived her film leading role as Otsuta.

Cast 
 Fujiko Yamamoto
 Kōji Tsuruta
 Masayuki Mori
 Sumiko Fujita
 Yasuko Kawakami
 Ryu Mita
 Kikuko Tachibana

References

External links 
 

Japanese black-and-white films
1955 films
Films directed by Teinosuke Kinugasa
Daiei Film films
Films scored by Ichirō Saitō
Japanese romance films
1950s romance films
1950s Japanese films